The Kiwoom Heroes are a South Korean professional baseball team based in Seoul. They are a member of the KBO League. The Heroes play their home games at Gocheok Sky Dome in Gocheok-dong, a neighborhood located in the southwestern part of Seoul. The Heroes mascot is Teokdori (Mr. Jaw).

In 2014, the Futures League squad changed its name to Hwaseong Heroes, differentiating from the first string.
In 2019, Hwaseong Heroes renamed as Goyang Heroes.

History 

The franchise was originally known as the Sammi SuperStars and had subsequent incarnations as the Chungbo Pintos and Pacific Dolphins. The team was renamed the Hyundai Unicorns after being sold to Hyundai in 1996, and was relocated from Incheon to Suwon. The Unicorns won the KBO championship four times (1998, 2000, 2003 and 2004).

In January 2008, the team was dissolved. After that, Centennial Investments founded a new team called the Woori Heroes. Unlike the other KBO League ballclubs, the Heroes are owned by a collection of individuals headed by Lee Chang-suk (founder), instead of being owned by its naming sponsor. During the 2008 season, Woori Tobacco Company broke the naming sponsor deal, citing that the Heroes has not paid the full founding fee to the KBO yet, forcing the team to trade most of its star players for cash. For the rest of the 2008 season and the 2009 season, the team used only "Heroes" for its name.

On 8 February 2010, naming rights were sold to Nexen Tire.

On 6 November 2018, naming rights were sold to Kiwoom Securities. The Kiwoom Heroes made it to the Korean Series in their first year, but lost to the Doosan Bears to finish second.

Season-by-season records

Current roster

Managers
Lee Kwang-hwan (2008)
Kim Si-jin (2009–2012)
Kim Sung-gap (2012) (caretaker)
Youm Kyoung-youb (2013–2016)
Jang Jeong-seok (2017–2019)
Son Heuk (2020)
Kim Chang-hyun (2020–2021) (caretaker)
Hong Won-ki (2021–present)

Notes

References 
General

Specific

External links 

  

 
KBO League teams
Baseball teams established in 2008
Sport in Seoul
2008 establishments in South Korea